The following is a list of golf equipment manufacturers.

Current 

Acushnet Company
Adams Golf
Aldila (shafts)
Antigua Apparel
Ben Sayers
Bettinardi Golf
Bridgestone Golf
Buggies Unlimited
Callaway Golf Company
Cleveland Golf
Club Car
Cobra Golf
Cutter & Buck
Dunlop Sport
Element 21
FootJoy, a brand of Acushnet, subsidiary of Fila
Forgan of St Andrews
Galvin Green
Glenmuir
John Letters
KZG
Lamkin Grips
Loudmouth Golf
MacGregor Golf
Maxfli
Mizuno
Nike Golf
Odyssey Golf, a Callaway Golf brand
Penfold Golf
PING
Pinnacle Golf, a brand of Acushnet, a subsidiary of Fila
Polara Golf
PowaKaddy
Puma
PXG
Scotty Cameron, a brand of Acushnet, a subsidiary of Fila
Slazenger
Srixon
STX
TaylorMade
Titleist, a brand of Acushnet, a subsidiary of Fila
Vokey Design (Bob Vokey), a brand of Acushnet, a subsidiary of Fila
Wilson Staff
Yonex

Former 
Ben Hogan Golf Company
Preceptor Golf
Spalding (former owner of the Top-Flite, Ben Hogan and Strata brands)

Golf equipment

See also 

 List of disc golf brands and manufacturers